Logan High School is a four-year public high school in the western United States, located in Logan, Utah. Established  in 1917 as part of the Logan City School District, its campus is in the southwest part of the city. Logan High is currently in the Utah High School Activities Association (UHSAA) Class 4A Region XII and its mascot is a Grizzly.

History

The city school board voted to establish a high school in 1917, having previously only offered an education through the 8th grade. High school was previously conducted at Brigham Young College in Logan. A building to house the new high school was completed in 1919, on the corner of Church and Federal Avenues in Logan. The first senior class graduated in 1921. In 1926 the school relocated to the campus of recently closed Brigham Young College, on 200 S between 100 and 300 W.

A magnitude 5.7 earthquake on 30 August 1962 caused significant damage to the old college buildings. In 1968 a new athletic field complex was completed, and named after the late Glen "Zeus" Worthington, the school's athletic director  and USU and state of Utah Athletic Hall of Fame inductee.
A physical education complex was added in 1978.

In 1984 the school expanded to include a freshman class. With the increasing number of students, the Woodruff Elementary school was closed and converted to the English department and writing lab; a new Woodruff was constructed at 650 S 1000 W. The old boys' gym was demolished in the summer of 1999 and a new gymnasium, lobby, and storage area was built in its place, opening during the 2000–2001 school year. During the 2003–2004 school year several athletic fields were renovated or built, including a new turf football field, softball diamond, and sand volleyball courts. These were followed by a new state-of-the-art baseball diamond, constructed during the 2006–2007 school year. In 2007 a large addition was built for the school, which included a media center, larger cafeteria, and new classrooms as well as remodeling along the south and west sides of the building. In 2015 the athletics facilities, including the baseball and softball diamonds, football field, and basketball arena underwent renovation under new athletic director Mike Hansen. Work began on a complete remodel of the entire high school in 2015, and was completed in 2018.

Art programs 
The school offers several co-curricular activities in the arts, including orchestra, band, and choir programs, as well as visual arts, ceramics, and photography programs. LHS offers a drama program and theater arts classes along with an extracurricular drama club. The school puts on a musical (with pit orchestra) and a play each year, as well as a Concerto Night in which audition-selected students perform an instrumental concerto with the full Philharmonic Orchestra.

Orchestra 
The LHS Orchestra program consists of three string orchestras with a total of about 150 students.  The orchestras are divided by grade level; the Concert Orchestra is made up of freshmen, the Sinfonia Orchestra consists of sophomores, and the Philharmonic Orchestra consists of juniors and seniors. Logan High orchestras regularly qualify for state-level competition.

Band 
LHS has two bands, the lower or symphonic band and the upper or wind band, as well as two extracurricular jazz bands. Unlike the orchestra, the bands are not split up by grade but by skill.  The Wind Band and Jazz Band go on national trips every other year, visiting cities such as Boston, Chicago, New York, San Diego, and Washington, D.C.  They also regularly participate in state and regional festivals and competitions.

Extra-curricular activities
Logan High School offers over 25 student clubs and 17 varsity athletic teams.  Notable student organizations include the debate team, which won the Utah class 3A state title during the 2007–2008 school year and took second in the 2009–2010 4A State Tournament; the football team, which won state titles in 1978, 1988, 1989, 2000, 2005, 2007, 2011, and 2015; the swimming team, which  claimed the state title in 2001, 2002, 2004 and 2005, 2006, 2009, the boys' tennis team, which won state in 2009; the lacrosse team, which claimed state titles in 2006 and 2015; and the ice hockey team, which won the state championship in 2009. Logan High's suicide checkers team won the state championship in 2009. Logan High School also has a competitive math league, which took first in the state math contest in 2011. Logan also regularly competes in Academic Olympiad at Utah State University.

Student Body Officers

Any student that is a current sophomore or junior with a 3.0 GPA and no failing grades, is eligible to run for a Student Body Office. The offices that can be held are President (Seniors Only), Executive Vice-President (Seniors Only), Historian (Seniors Only), Academics VP (Juniors and Seniors), Activities and Clubs VP (Juniors and Seniors), Athletics VP (Juniors and Seniors), Publicity VP (Juniors and Seniors), Service VP (Juniors and Seniors), and the Student Outreach VP (Juniors and Seniors). Student Body Officer elections are held in March. The newly elected officers will then spend the remainder of the year planning for Beach Week, which is the second to last week of the school year. The Student Body Officers for the 2021-2022 school year are, President: Maizee Fryer, Executive Vice-President: Junsung Lee, Historian: Samuel Toledo, Academics VP: Andrew Decker, Activities and Clubs VP: Spencer Needham, Athletics VP: Trey Davidson, Publicity VP: Oakley Seamons, Service VP: Afton Murrary, and Student Outreach VP: Gracie Fife. Note: The parenthesis represents the grade requirement for that office.

Football

State championships

1978, 1988, 1989, 2000, 2005, 2007, 2011, 2015

Coaching

Mike Favero took over the head coaching position at Logan High in 1999.  He has successfully led the program to be competitive in the state. Favero has received numerous honors and awards, including Western United States NFHS Coach of the Year (2008), UHSAA Coach of the Year (2008), four-time UFCA Coach of the Year (2000, 2005, 2007, 2011), USA Football Champions Award (2007), as well as serving as the 2007 NFL Youth Football State of Utah delegate.

Notable player achievements

 Merlin Olsen: former NFL Hall of Famer, Los Angeles Rams
 Chris Cooley: former NFL Pro Bowl tight end, Washington Redskins, Parade All-American
 Phil Olsen: former NFL Player, Los Angeles Rams
Hal Garner: former NFL linebacker, Buffalo Bills
Willie Beecher: former NFL kicker, Miami Dolphins

Riley Nelson: Utah Gatorade Player of the Year, Parade All-American
DJ Nelson: Max Preps 2nd Team All-American
30 collegiate football players
43 1st team all-state players
Brandon Stephens: PrepStar All-American, Bluechip All-American, Superprep All-American, ESPN TOP 100 List, USA Today Top 100, Utah Football Foundation Hall of Fame
Rod Tueller: former head coach of the Utah State Aggies men's basketball team; served as head coach at LHS prior to taking over at USU

Mike Favero era
5 State Championships (2000, 2005, 2007, 2011, 2015)
2 Top 100 national rankings 2005 #72 and 2011 #92
6 State Championship game appearances (2000, 2003, 2005, 2007, 2011, 2015)
8 Region Championships (2000, 2001, 2005, 2007, 2010, 2011, 2013, 2015)

Notable alumni
 May Swenson: poet and playwright
 Willie Beecher: former NFL kicker for the Miami Dolphins
 Chris Cooley: NFL Pro Bowl tight end for Washington Redskins
 Pepa (Sandra Denton) (attended): hip–hop artist, rapper and actress. 
 Luke Falk: quarterback at Washington State University, LHS class of 2013
 Hal Garner: former NFL linebacker for Buffalo Bills
 Lars Peter Hansen: economics professor and Nobel Prize winner
 Merlin Olsen: NFL Hall of Famer with Los Angeles Rams and actor
 Phil Olsen: former NFL player with Los Angeles Rams
 Rod Tueller: former head coach of Utah State Aggies men's basketball team; head coach at LHS prior to taking over at USU
 Kip Thorne: scientist in fields of astrophysics and gravitational physics, Professor of Theoretical Physics at California Institute of Technology, co-winner of the 2017 Nobel Prize in Physics.

References

External links

 
 Logan Grizzlies – athletics site
 Max Preps – Logan Grizzlies
 Logan City School District

Public high schools in Utah
Educational institutions established in 1917
Schools in Cache County, Utah
Buildings and structures in Logan, Utah
1917 establishments in Utah